Ministry of Woman and Child Development Department Maharashtra is a Ministry of Government of Maharashtra.

The Ministry is currently headed by Mangal Lodha he is a Cabinet Minister For this Department .

Head office

List of Cabinet Ministers

List of Ministers of State

References

Government ministries of Maharashtra